A sound card (also known as an audio card) is an internal expansion card that provides input and output of audio signals to and from a computer under the control of computer programs. The term sound card is also applied to external audio interfaces used for professional audio applications.

Sound functionality can also be integrated onto the motherboard, using components similar to those found on plug-in cards. The integrated sound system is often still referred to as a sound card. Sound processing hardware is also present on modern video cards with HDMI to output sound along with the video using that connector; previously they used a S/PDIF connection to the motherboard or sound card.

Typical uses of sound cards or sound card functionality include providing the audio component for multimedia applications such as music composition, editing video or audio, presentation, education and entertainment (games) and video projection. Sound cards are also used for computer-based communication such as voice over IP and teleconferencing.

General characteristics

Sound cards use a digital-to-analog converter (DAC), which converts recorded or generated digital signal data into an analog format. The output signal is connected to an amplifier, headphones, or external device using standard interconnects, such as a TRS phone connector.

A common external connector is the microphone connector. Input through a microphone connector can be used, for example, by speech recognition or voice over IP applications. Most sound cards have a line in connector for an analog input from a sound source that has higher voltage levels than a microphone. In either case, the sound card uses an analog-to-digital converter to digitize this signal.

Some cards include a sound chip to support the production of synthesized sounds, usually for real-time generation of music and sound effects using minimal data and CPU time.

The card may use direct memory access to transfer the samples to and from main memory, from where a recording and playback software may read and write it to the hard disk for storage, editing, or further processing.

Sound channels and polyphony

An important sound card characteristic is polyphony, which refers to its ability to process and output multiple independent voices or sounds simultaneously. These distinct channels are seen as the number of audio outputs, which may correspond to a speaker configuration such as 2.0 (stereo), 2.1 (stereo and sub woofer), 5.1 (surround), or other configurations. Sometimes, the terms voice and channel are used interchangeably to indicate the degree of polyphony, not the output speaker configuration. For example, much older sound chips could accommodate three voices, but only one output audio channel (i.e., a single mono output), requiring all voices to be mixed together. Later cards, such as the AdLib sound card, had a 9-voice polyphony combined in 1 mono output channel.

Early PC sound cards had multiple FM synthesis voices (typically 9 or 16) which were used for MIDI music. The full capabilities of advanced cards are often not fully used; only one (mono) or two (stereo) voice(s) and channel(s) are usually dedicated to playback of digital sound samples, and playing back more than one digital sound sample usually requires a software downmix at a fixed sampling rate. Modern low-cost integrated sound cards (i.e., those built into motherboards) such as audio codecs like those meeting the AC'97 standard and even some lower-cost expansion sound cards still work this way. These devices may provide more than two sound output channels (typically 5.1 or 7.1 surround sound), but they usually have no actual hardware polyphony for either sound effects or MIDI reproduction these tasks are performed entirely in software. This is similar to the way inexpensive softmodems perform modem tasks in software rather than in hardware.

In the early days of wavetable synthesis, some sound card manufacturers advertised polyphony solely on the MIDI capabilities alone. In this case, typically, the card is only capable of two channels of digital sound and the polyphony specification solely applies to the number of MIDI instruments the sound card is capable of producing at once.

Modern sound cards may provide more flexible audio accelerator capabilities which can be used in support of higher levels of polyphony or other purposes such as hardware acceleration of 3D sound, positional audio and real-time DSP effects.

List of sound card standards

Color codes
Connectors on the sound cards are color-coded as per the PC System Design Guide. They may also have symbols of arrows, holes and soundwaves that are associated with each jack position.

History of sound cards for the IBM PC architecture

Sound cards for IBM PC compatible computers were very uncommon until 1988. For the majority IBM PC users, the internal PC speaker was the only way for early PC software to produce sound and music. The speaker hardware was typically limited to square waves. The resulting sound was generally described as "beeps and boops" which resulted in the common nickname beeper. Several companies, most notably Access Software, developed techniques for digital sound reproduction over the PC speaker like RealSound. The resulting audio, while functional, suffered from the heavily distorted output and low volume, and usually required all other processing to be stopped while sounds were played. Other home computers of the 1980s like the Commodore 64 included hardware support for digital sound playback or music synthesis, leaving the IBM PC at a disadvantage when it came to multimedia applications. Early sound cards for the IBM PC platform were not designed for gaming or multimedia applications, but rather on specific audio applications, such as music composition with the AdLib Personal Music System, IBM Music Feature Card, and Creative Music System, or on speech synthesis like Digispeech DS201, Covox Speech Thing, and Street Electronics Echo.

In 1988, a panel of computer-game CEOs stated at the Consumer Electronics Show that the PC's limited sound capability prevented it from becoming the leading home computer, that it needed a $49–79 sound card with better capability than current products, and that once such hardware was widely installed, their companies would support it. Sierra On-Line, which had pioneered supporting EGA and VGA video, and 3-1/2" disks, promised that year to support the AdLib, IBM Music Feature, and Roland MT-32 sound cards in its games. A 1989 Computer Gaming World survey found that 18 of 25 game companies planned to support AdLib, six Roland and Covox, and seven Creative Music System/Game Blaster.

Hardware manufacturers
One of the first manufacturers of sound cards for the IBM PC was AdLib, which produced a card based on the Yamaha YM3812 sound chip, also known as the OPL2. The AdLib had two modes: A 9-voice mode where each voice could be fully programmed, and a less frequently used percussion mode with 3 regular voices producing 5 independent percussion-only voices for a total of 11.

Creative Labs also marketed a sound card about the same time called the Creative Music System (C/MS). Although the C/MS had twelve voices to AdLib's nine, and was a stereo card while the AdLib was mono, the basic technology behind it was based on the Philips SAA1099 chip which was essentially a square-wave generator. It sounded much like twelve simultaneous PC speakers would have except for each channel having amplitude control, and failed to sell well, even after Creative renamed it the Game Blaster a year later, and marketed it through RadioShack in the US. The Game Blaster retailed for under $100 and was compatible with many popular games, such as Silpheed.

A large change in the IBM PC compatible sound card market happened when Creative Labs introduced the Sound Blaster card. Recommended by Microsoft to developers creating software based on the Multimedia PC standard, the Sound Blaster cloned the AdLib and added a sound coprocessor for recording and playback of digital audio. The card also included a game port for adding a joystick, and the capability to interface to MIDI equipment using the game port and a special cable. With AdLib compatibility and more features at nearly the same price, most buyers chose the Sound Blaster. It eventually outsold the AdLib and dominated the market.

Roland also made sound cards in the late 1980s such as the MT-32 and LAPC-I. Roland cards sold for hundreds of dollars. Many games had music written for their cards, such as Silpheed and Police Quest II. The cards were often poor at sound effects such as laughs, but for music was by far the best sound cards available until the mid-nineties. Some Roland cards, such as the SCC, and later versions of the MT-32 were made to be less expensive.

By 1992, one sound card vendor advertised that its product was "Sound Blaster, AdLib, Disney Sound Source and Covox Speech Thing Compatible!" Responding to readers complaining about an article on sound cards that unfavorably mentioned the Gravis Ultrasound, Computer Gaming World stated in January 1994 that, "The de facto standard in the gaming world is Sound Blaster compatibility ... It would have been unfair to have recommended anything else." The magazine that year stated that Wing Commander II was "Probably the game responsible" for making it the standard card. The Sound Blaster line of cards, together with the first inexpensive CD-ROM drives and evolving video technology, ushered in a new era of multimedia computer applications that could play back CD audio, add recorded dialogue to video games, or even reproduce full motion video (albeit at much lower resolutions and quality in early days). The widespread decision to support the Sound Blaster design in multimedia and entertainment titles meant that future sound cards such as Media Vision's Pro Audio Spectrum and the Gravis Ultrasound had to be Sound Blaster compatible if they were to sell well. Until the early 2000s, when the AC'97 audio standard became more widespread and eventually usurped the SoundBlaster as a standard due to its low cost and integration into many motherboards, Sound Blaster compatibility was a standard that many other sound cards supported to maintain compatibility with many games and applications released.

Industry adoption

When game company Sierra On-Line opted to support add-on music hardware in addition to built-in hardware such as the PC speaker and built-in sound capabilities of the IBM PCjr and Tandy 1000, what could be done with sound and music on the IBM PC changed dramatically. Two of the companies Sierra partnered with were Roland and AdLib, opting to produce in-game music for King's Quest 4 that supported the MT-32 and AdLib Music Synthesizer. The MT-32 had superior output quality, due in part to its method of sound synthesis as well as built-in reverb. Since it was the most sophisticated synthesizer they supported, Sierra chose to use most of the MT-32's custom features and unconventional instrument patches, producing background sound effects (e.g., chirping birds, clopping horse hooves, etc.) before the Sound Blaster brought digital audio playback to the PC. Many game companies also supported the MT-32, but supported the Adlib card as an alternative because of the latter's higher market base. The adoption of the MT-32 led the way for the creation of the MPU-401, Roland Sound Canvas and General MIDI standards as the most common means of playing in-game music until the mid-1990s.

Feature evolution
Early ISA bus sound cards were half-duplex, meaning they couldn't record and play digitized sound simultaneously. Later, ISA cards like the SoundBlaster AWE series and Plug-and-play Soundblaster clones supported simultaneous recording and playback, but at the expense of using up two IRQ and DMA channels instead of one. Conventional PCI bus cards generally do not have these limitations and are mostly full-duplex.

Sound cards have evolved in terms of digital audio sampling rate (starting from 8-bit , to 32-bit,  that the latest solutions support). Along the way, some cards started offering wavetable synthesis, which provides superior MIDI synthesis quality relative to the earlier Yamaha OPL based solutions, which uses FM-synthesis. Some higher-end cards introduced their own RAM and processor for user-definable sound samples and MIDI instruments as well as to offload audio processing from the CPU.

With some exceptions, for years, sound cards, most notably the Sound Blaster series and their compatibles, had only one or two channels of digital sound. Early games and MOD-players needing more channels than a card could support had to resort to mixing multiple channels in software. Even today, the tendency is still to mix multiple sound streams in software, except in products specifically intended for gamers or professional musicians.

Outputs
The number of physical sound channels has also increased. The first sound card solutions were mono. Stereo sound was introduced in the early 1980s, and quadraphonic sound came in 1989. This was shortly followed by 5.1 channel audio. The latest sound cards support up to 8 audio channels for the 7.1 speaker setup.

A few early sound cards had sufficient power to drive unpowered speakers directlyfor example, two watts per channel. With the popularity of amplified speakers, sound cards no longer have a power stage, though in many cases they can adequately drive headphones.

Professional sound cards

Professional sound cards are sound cards optimized for high-fidelity, low-latency multichannel sound recording and playback. Their drivers usually follow the Audio Stream Input/Output protocol for use with professional sound engineering and music software.

Professional sound cards are usually described as audio interfaces, and sometimes have the form of external rack-mountable units using USB, FireWire, or an optical interface, to offer sufficient data rates. The emphasis in these products is, in general, on multiple input and output connectors, direct hardware support for multiple input and output sound channels, as well as higher sampling rates and fidelity as compared to the usual consumer sound card.

On the other hand, certain features of consumer sound cards such as support for 3D audio, hardware acceleration in video games, or real-time ambiance effects are secondary, nonexistent or even undesirable in professional audio interfaces, and as such audio interfaces are not recommended for the typical home user.

The typical consumer-grade sound card is intended for generic home, office, and entertainment purposes with an emphasis on playback and casual use, rather than catering to the needs of audio professionals. In general, consumer-grade sound cards impose several restrictions and inconveniences that would be unacceptable to an audio professional. Consumer sound cards are also limited in the effective sampling rates and bit depths they can actually manage and have lower numbers of less flexible input channels. Professional studio recording use typically requires more than the two channels that consumer sound cards provide, and more accessible connectors, unlike the variable mixture of internal—and sometimes virtual—and external connectors found in consumer-grade sound cards.

Sound devices other than expansion cards

Integrated sound hardware on PC motherboards
In 1984, the first IBM PCjr had a rudimentary 3-voice sound synthesis chip (the SN76489) which was capable of generating three square-wave tones with variable amplitude, and a pseudo-white noise channel that could generate primitive percussion sounds. The Tandy 1000, initially a clone of the PCjr, duplicated this functionality, with the Tandy 1000 TL/SL/RL models adding digital sound recording and playback capabilities. Many games during the 1980s that supported the PCjr's video standard (described as Tandy-compatible, Tandy graphics, or TGA) also supported PCjr/Tandy 1000 audio.

In the late 1990s, many computer manufacturers began to replace plug-in sound cards with an audio codec chip (a combined audio AD/DA-converter) integrated into the motherboard. Many of these used Intel's AC'97 specification. Others used inexpensive ACR slot accessory cards.

From around 2001, many motherboards incorporated full-featured sound cards, usually in the form of a custom chipset, providing something akin to full Sound Blaster compatibility and relatively high-quality sound. However, these features were dropped when AC'97 was superseded by Intel's HD Audio standard, which was released in 2004, again specified the use of a codec chip, and slowly gained acceptance. As of 2011, most motherboards have returned to using a codec chip, albeit an HD Audio compatible one, and the requirement for Sound Blaster compatibility relegated to history.

Integrated sound on other platforms
Various non-IBM PC compatible computers, such as early home computers like the Commodore 64 (1982) (and by extension Commodore 128 in 1985) and Amiga (1985), NEC's PC-88, and PC-98, Fujitsu's FM-7 and FM Towns, Sharp's X1 and X68000, Acorn's BBC Micro, Electron and Archimedes, Atari's 8-bit home computers, ST and Falcon, Amstrad's CPC, later revisions of Sinclair's ZX Spectrum, the MSX, Apple's Macintosh and IIGS, and workstations from manufacturers like Sun, Silicon Graphics and NeXT have had their own motherboard-integrated sound devices. In some cases, most notably in those of the Macintosh, IIGS, Amiga, C64, PC-98, SGI Indigo, X68000, MSX, Falcon, Archimedes, FM-7 and FM Towns, they provide very advanced capabilities (as of the time of manufacture), in others they are only minimal capabilities. Some of these platforms have also had sound cards designed for their bus architectures that cannot be used in a standard PC.

Several Japanese computer platforms, including the PC-88, PC-98, MSX, X1, X68000, FM Towns and FM-7, featured built-in FM synthesis sound from Yamaha by the mid-1980s. By 1989, the FM Towns computer platform featured built-in PCM sample-based sound and supported the CD-ROM format.

The custom sound chip on Amiga, named Paula, had four digital sound channels (2 for the left speaker and 2 for the right) with 8-bit resolution for each channel and a 6-bit volume control per channel. Sound playback on Amiga was done by reading directly from the chip RAM without using the main CPU.

Most arcade games have integrated sound chips, the most popular being the Yamaha OPL chip for music coupled with a variety of DACs for sampled audio and sound effects.

Sound cards on other platforms

The earliest known sound card used by computers was the Gooch Synthetic Woodwind, a music device for PLATO terminals, and is widely hailed as the precursor to sound cards and MIDI. It was invented in 1972.

Certain early arcade machines made use of sound cards to achieve playback of complex audio waveforms and digital music, despite being already equipped with onboard audio. An example of a sound card used in arcade machines is the Digital Compression System card, used in games from Midway. For example, Mortal Kombat II on the Midway T-Unit hardware. The T-Unit hardware already has an onboard YM2151 OPL chip coupled with an OKI 6295 DAC, but said game uses an added-on DCS card instead. The card is also used in the arcade version of Midway and Aerosmith's Revolution X for complex looping music and speech playback.

MSX computers, while equipped with built-in sound capabilities, also relied on sound cards to produce better quality audio. The card, known as Moonsound, uses a Yamaha OPL4 sound chip. Prior to the Moonsound, there were also sound cards called MSX Music and MSX Audio for the system, which uses OPL2 and OPL3 chipsets.

The Apple II computers, which did not have sound capabilities beyond rapidly clicking a speaker until the IIGS, could use plug-in sound cards from a variety of manufacturers. The first, in 1978, was ALF's Apple Music Synthesizer, with 3 voices; two or three cards could be used to create 6 or 9 voices in stereo. Later ALF created the Apple Music II, a 9-voice model. The most widely supported card, however, was the Mockingboard. Sweet Micro Systems sold the Mockingboard in various models. Early Mockingboard models ranged from 3 voices in mono, while some later designs had 6 voices in stereo. Some software supported use of two Mockingboard cards, which allowed 12-voice music and sound. A 12-voice, single-card clone of the Mockingboard called the Phasor was made by Applied Engineering.

The ZX Spectrum that initially only had a beeper had some sound cards made for it. Examples include TurboSound Other examples are the Fuller Box, and Zon X-81.

The Commodore 64, while having an integrated SID chip, also had sound cards made for it. For example, the Sound Expander, which added on an OPL FM synthesizer.

The PC-98 series of computers, like their IBM PC cousins, also do not have integrated sound contrary to popular belief, and their default configuration is a PC speaker driven by a timer. Sound cards were made for the C-Bus expansion slots that these computers had, most of which used Yamaha's FM and PSG chips and made by NEC themselves, although aftermarket clones can also be purchased, and Creative did release a C-Bus version of the SoundBlaster line of sound cards for the platform.

External sound devices
Devices such as the Covox Speech Thing could be attached to the parallel port of an IBM PC and fed 6- or 8-bit PCM sample data to produce audio. Also, many types of professional sound cards take the form of an external FireWire or USB unit, usually for convenience and improved fidelity.

Sound cards using the PC Card interface were available before laptop and notebook computers routinely had onboard sound. Most of these units were designed for mobile DJs, providing separate outputs to allow both playback and monitoring from one system, however, some also target mobile gamers.

USB sound cards

USB sound cards are external devices that plug into the computer via USB. They are often used in studios and on stage by electronic musicians including live PA performers and DJs. DJs who use DJ software typically use sound cards integrated into DJ controllers or specialized DJ sound cards. DJ sound cards sometimes have inputs with phono preamplifiers to allow turntables to be connected to the computer to control the software's playback of music files with vinyl emulation.

The USB specification defines a standard interface, the USB audio device class, allowing a single driver to work with the various USB sound devices and interfaces on the market. Mac OS X, Windows, and Linux support this standard. However, some USB sound cards do not conform to the standard and require proprietary drivers from the manufacturer.

Cards meeting the older USB 1.1 specification are capable of high-quality sound with a limited number of channels, but USB 2.0 or later is more capable.

Uses
The main function of a sound card is to play audio, usually music, with varying formats (monophonic, stereophonic, various multiple speaker setups) and degrees of control. The source may be a CD or DVD, a file, streamed audio, or any external source connected to a sound card input. Audio may be recorded. Sometimes sound card hardware and drivers do not support recording a source that is being played.

A card can also be used, in conjunction with software, to generate arbitrary waveforms, acting as an audio-frequency function generator. Free and commercial software is available for this purpose; there are also online services that generate audio files for any desired waveforms, playable through a sound card.

A card can be used, again in conjunction with free or commercial software, to analyze input waveforms. For example, a very-low-distortion sinewave oscillator can be used as input to equipment under test; the output is sent to a sound card's line input and run through Fourier transform software to find the amplitude of each harmonic of the added distortion. Alternatively, a less pure signal source may be used, with circuitry to subtract the input from the output, attenuated and phase-corrected; the result is distortion and noise only, which can be analyzed.

There are programs that allow a sound card to be used as an audio-frequency oscilloscope.

For all measurement purposes a sound card must be chosen with good audio properties. It must itself contribute as little distortion and noise as possible, and attention must be paid to bandwidth and sampling. A typical integrated sound card, the Realtek ALC887, according to its data sheet has distortion of about 80 dB below the fundamental; cards are available with distortion better than −100 dB.

Sound cards with a sampling rate of 192 kHz can be used to synchronize the clock of the computer with a time signal transmitter working on frequencies below 96 kHz like DCF 77 with a special software and a coil at the entrance of the sound card, working as antenna.

Driver architecture
To use a sound card, the operating system (OS) typically requires a specific device driver, a low-level program that handles the data connections between the physical hardware and the operating system. Some operating systems include the drivers for many cards; for cards not so supported, drivers are supplied with the card, or available for download.

 DOS programs for the IBM PC often had to use universal middleware driver libraries (such as the HMI Sound Operating System, the Miles Audio Interface Libraries (AIL), the Miles Sound System etc.) which had drivers for most common sound cards, since DOS itself had no real concept of a sound card. Some card manufacturers provided terminate-and-stay-resident drivers for their products. Often the driver is a Sound Blaster and AdLib emulator designed to allow their products to emulate a Sound Blaster and AdLib, and to allow games that could only use SoundBlaster or AdLib sound to work with the card. Finally, some programs simply had driver or middleware source code incorporated into the program itself for the sound cards that were supported.
 Microsoft Windows uses drivers generally written by the sound card manufacturers. Many device manufacturers supply the drivers on their own discs or to Microsoft for inclusion on Windows installation disc. Sometimes drivers are also supplied by the individual vendors for download and installation. Bug fixes and other improvements are likely to be available faster via downloading, since CDs cannot be updated as frequently as a web or FTP site. USB audio device class support is present from Windows 98 SE onwards. Since Microsoft's Universal Audio Architecture (UAA) initiative which supports the HD Audio, FireWire and USB audio device class standards, a universal class driver by Microsoft can be used. The driver is included with Windows Vista. For Windows XP, Windows 2000 or Windows Server 2003, the driver can be obtained by contacting Microsoft support. Almost all manufacturer-supplied drivers for such devices also include this class driver.
 A number of versions of UNIX make use of the portable Open Sound System (OSS). Drivers are seldom produced by the card manufacturer.
 Most present day Linux distributions make use of the Advanced Linux Sound Architecture (ALSA). Up until Linux kernel 2.4, OSS was the standard sound architecture for Linux, although ALSA can be downloaded, compiled and installed separately for kernels 2.2 or higher. But from kernel 2.5 onwards, ALSA was integrated into the kernel and the OSS native drivers were deprecated. Backwards compatibility with OSS-based software is maintained, however, by the use of the ALSA-OSS compatibility API and the OSS-emulation kernel modules.
 Mockingboard support on the Apple II is usually incorporated into the programs itself as many programs for the Apple II boot directly from disk. However a TSR is shipped on a disk that adds instructions to Apple Basic so users can create programs that use the card, provided that the TSR is loaded first.

List of sound card manufacturers

 AIM
 Asus
 Advanced Gravis Computer Technology (defunct)
 AdLib (defunct)
 Aureal Semiconductor (defunct)
 Auzentech (defunct)
 Aztech Labs
 Behavior Tech Computer
 Behringer
 C-Media
 Creative Technology
 Conexant
 E-mu (bought out by Creative)
 Ensoniq (bought out by Creative)
 ESI
 HT Omega
 Lynx Studio Technology
 MARIAN
 M-Audio
 Onkyo
 Prism Sound
 Realtek Semiconductor
 RME
 Roland
 Trident Microsystems (defunct)
 Turtle Beach Systems
 VIA Technologies
 Yamaha
 Zoltrix (AdLib clone manufacturer)

See also

 Analog Devices
 Sound chip
 EAX
 ASIO
 Audio signal processing
 Audio Libraries (Categories)
 Codec
 Virtual Studio Technology (VST)
 Cross-platform Audio Creation Tool (XACT)
 DirectSound
 DirectMusic
 OpenAL
 Programmable sound generator
 Dolby Digital
 Dolby Digital EX
 S Logic
 SNR
 Sound card mixer
 Audio compression (data)
 PC System Design Guide

Notes

References

External links

 Jumper settings for many sound cards
 History of PC sound hardware
 
 

Hardware acceleration
Sound cards